Joly is an impact crater on Mars, located at 74.7°S latitude and 42.7°W longitude in the Mare Australe quadrangle. It measures 79.9 kilometers in diameter and was named after Irish physicist John Joly (1857–1933). The name was approved in 1973, by the International Astronomical Union (IAU) Working Group for Planetary System Nomenclature (WGPSN).

Spiders 

During the winter, much frost accumulates. It freezes out directly onto the surface of the permanent polar cap, which is made of water ice covered with layers of dust and sand. The deposit begins as a layer of dusty CO2 frost. Over the winter, it recrystallizes and becomes denser. The dust and sand particles caught in the frost slowly sink. By the time temperatures rise in the spring, the frost layer has become a slab of semi-transparent ice about 3 feet thick, lying on a substrate of dark sand and dust. This dark material absorbs light and causes the ice to sublimate (turn directly into a gas) Eventually much gas accumulates and becomes pressurized. When it finds a weak spot, the gas escapes and blows out the dust. Speeds can reach 100 miles per hour. Dark channels can sometimes be seen; they are called "spiders." The surface appears covered with dark spots when this process is occurring.

Many ideas have been advanced to explain these features. These features can be seen in some of the pictures below.

See also
 Climate of Mars
 Geology of Mars
 Geyser (Mars)
 Impact crater
 Impact event
 List of craters on Mars
 Ore resources on Mars
 Planetary nomenclature

References 

Mare Australe quadrangle
Impact craters on Mars